Tel Burga is an archaeological site  in the Sharon Plain 1 km east of Binyamina, Israel.

History
Tel Burga was a small fortified site strategically located between larger cities in Canaan in a position to support growing urban culture during the Middle Bronze Age. Archaeological surveys on site identified the remains of at least two towers and a wall, as well as ceramic remains from various periods, starting with the Chalcolithic; Early, Intermediate and Middle Bronze and Iron Ages. Roman and Medieval artifacts were also found.

See also
Archaeology of Israel

References

Archaeological sites in Israel